Estadio Cancun 86 is a stadium in Cancún, Quintana Roo, Mexico. It is primarily used for association football and is the home field of Pioneros de Cancún. The stadium holds 6,390 people and is located at Prolongacion Av. Tulum Super Manzana 89. Events held at the stadium include the 2005 Mexican National Olympics.

The stadium was constructed for the Pioneros de Cancún in a project led by architects Rafael Lara and Rodolfo Páez. The Pioneros played their first game in the stadium on 27 December 1986, defeating Coras de Tepic 3–2 with the historic first goal coming from Fernando Cruz Pichardo.

The stadium hosted the Tiburones de Cancún of the Fútbol Americano de México (FAM) league for their final two home games of the 2022 FAM season.

References

Cancun 86
Sports venues in Quintana Roo
Cancún